John J. Zogby (born September 3, 1948) is an American public opinion pollster, author, and public speaker. He is founder of the Zogby International poll, and he serves as a senior partner at John Zogby Strategies, a full-service marketing and political consulting firm, which was created in 2016 with his sons, Benjamin and Jeremy. Zogby has written weekly articles for Forbes, and he has contributed to a weekly ongoing presidential report card since the beginning of the Obama administration.

In addition to serving on the advisory board of the Arab American Institute, he was on the advisory board of Upstate Venture Connect, and from 2016 to 2018, he was Director of the Keenan Center for Entrepreneurship at Le Moyne College.

The author of three books, his latest was published in 2016, We Are Many, We Are One: Neo-Tribes and Tribal Analytics in 21st Century America.

Early years and education
Zogby, an internationally known pollster and author, was born on September 3, 1948, and grew up in Utica, New York. He is the son of Lebanese Catholic immigrants. His brother, James Zogby, is the founder of the Arab American Institute.

Zogby received a Bachelor's degree in history from Le Moyne College in 1970 and a Master's degree in history from Syracuse University in 1974, continued and completed doctoral work (all but dissertation) in 1978. He taught history and political science for 24 years.

Career
In 1981, Zogby ran for Mayor of Utica, New York.

Zogby launched his first polling company, John Zogby Associates, in 1984, conducting mainly local polls for candidates, parties, and the media in northeastern US communities through the 1980s. In December 1991, polling for several radio and television stations in Upstate New York, he published a poll in New York State showing that then-President George H.W. Bush was leading the state's Governor Mario Cuomo by 6 points in that state. Governor Cuomo decided to not enter the 1992 Presidential race the next day. By 1994, Zogby was polling the New York State gubernatorial race for the New York Post and WNYW- Fox 5. Zogby correctly called the winner, George Pataki, the only pollster to do so. Zogby's company was hired by Reuters News Agency to poll the 1996 presidential race. “All hail Zogby, the maverick predictor,” wrote Richard Morin, polling director at The Washington Post, when John Zogby was the only pollster who called the 1996 presidential election with near precision. Zogby achieved the same level of accuracy with his polling in the following two presidential elections.

Zogby has been featured as a live television election analyst for ABC (Australia), BBC, CBC, and NBC News as well as the Foreign Press Center in Washington since 1998. For over a decade, Zogby led his company's political polling on behalf of Reuters, NBC News, C-SPAN, the New York Post, the Atlanta Journal-Constitution, the Miami Herald, the Houston Chronicle, the Buffalo News, and the Albany Times Union.

Zogby has been a featured speaker for several associations including the Food Marketing Association, the Texas Cattlemen's Association and the Detroit Economic Club. He has also been the keynote speaker at events sponsored by think tanks including the Center for Strategic and International Studies in DC, Chatham House in London, and the French Institute for International Relations in Paris.

His analysis has been published in the New York Times, Wall Street Journal, Financial Times, and publications worldwide.

Advisory boards

Zogby was a former advisor at the Belfer Center of the Kennedy School of Government at Harvard University. He was also a fellow of the Catholic University Institute for Policy Research and Catholic Studies. He served on the advisory council for Bio-Technology for the Center for Strategic and International Studies (CSIS), and as a Commissioner on the Center for Strategic and International Studies Commission on Smart Power. He previously served on the congressional-created Advisory Group on Public Diplomacy for the Arab and Muslim World.

Zogby is the former chairman of the educational organization Sudan Sunrise. He was chairman of the capital campaign at Mohawk Valley Community College, where he used to teach. He served on the boards of the Arab American Institute and Upstate Venture Connect. He presently serves as Vice-Chairman of Caritas-Lebanon USA, a philanthropic NGO that offers food, educational, and health care to the people of Lebanon. He is also a member of the Bassett Health Network which offers medical services to an 8-county rural region of Upstate New York and is Chairman of the Friends of Bassett, its philanthropic arm.

Popular culture references

John Zogby's polls have been referenced in popular culture, including NBC's The West Wing, CW's Gossip Girl, the Netflix series House of Cards, Richard North Patterson's novel The Race, game shows such as Cash Cab, and the 25th Anniversary edition of Trivial Pursuit. Zogby Polls have been cited on The Tonight Show and parodied on The Late Show and NPR's All Things Considered.

In 2004 and 2008, he was a guest on The Daily Show with Jon Stewart.

Books and publications

He is the author of The Way We'll Be: The Zogby Report on the Transformation of the American Dream (Random House, 2008) and is co-author of the First Globals: Understanding, Managing, and Unleashing Our Millennial Generation (with Joan Snyder Kuhl).

His latest book, published in 2016, is entitled We Are Many, We Are One: Neo-Tribes and Tribal Analytics in 21st Century America, emphasizes a new paradigm for moving beyond demographics by allowing people who participated in the survey research to define themselves based on their attributes and values. The result is what Zogby describes as a bottom-up approach to segmentation analysis.

Additionally, Zogby writes weekly columns on Forbes.com and contributes a weekly Presidential report card for The Washington Examiner's Washington Secrets, by Paul Bedard. He is also a founding contributor to The Huffington Post.

Awards and degrees

A former trustee of Le Moyne College (2000–2009), Zogby received the Distinguished Alumni Award in June 2000.
In 2005, he was awarded Honorary Doctorate Degrees from the State University of New York and the Graduate School of Union University.
In 2009, Zogby received an Honorary Doctorate Degree from the College of St. Rose.
In 2008 he was awarded the Chancellor's Distinguished Fellows Award from the University of California Irvine.
He has also received awards from the American Task Force for Lebanon, and the Arab American Association of Greater Houston.
In 2014 he was honored at the Annual One to World Foundation Fulbright Awards Dinner at the Waldorf Astoria.
At home, he was named “A Living Legend” by the Oneida County Historical Association and has received the Distinguished Alumni Award from Notre Dame High School.

Bibliography

References

External links
 John Zogby Strategies
 
 
 
 

1948 births
American people of Arab descent
American people of Lebanese descent
Harvard Kennedy School people
Journalists from Upstate New York
Le Moyne College alumni
Living people
Syracuse University alumni
Writers from Utica, New York
Catholic University of America people
Pollsters